Yak tebe ne liubyty, Kyieve mii! is a lyrical song of Kyiv composer Ihor Shamo and lyrics by poet . At first the song was performed in 1962 in duet by Yuriy Gulyayev and  who at that time performed at Kyiv Opera Theatre.

After over half a century later, in 2014 the song became official anthem of Kyiv city.

Rough translation

Green sea is playing
Quiet day is fading away
So dear have become for me
the sloping banks of Dnipro
Where branches are swaying
of amorous dreams...
How can one not love you,
Kyiv, my dear!

Into eyes Cannas are gazing
My heart I will pour into them
Let them tell to my beloved one
How I faithfully love
I will dream and live now
On wings of my hopes...
How can one not love you,
Kyiv, my dear!

Falling my weary city
in peaceful and gentle sleep
There lights as a necklace
Have bloomed over Dnieper
Velvet of late afternoons
Is as euphoria surf
How can one not love you,
Kyiv, my dear!

Грає море зелене,
Тихий день догора.
Дорогими для мене
Стали схили Дніпра,
Де колишуться віти
Закоханих мрій...
Як тебе не любити,
Києве мій!

References

External links
 Notes to Yak tebe ne liubyty, Kyieve mii! at pisni.org.ua
 Kyieve mii (video)
 Kyieve mii at nashe.com.ua
 Yak tebe ne liubyty, Kyieve mii! - Official Anthem of Kyiv (audio) 

1962 songs
Culture in Kyiv
Songs about cities
Ukrainian songs